Göytəpə or Gëytepe may refer to:
Göytəpə, Agdam, Azerbaijan
Göytəpə, Ismailli, Azerbaijan
Göytəpə, Jalilabad, Azerbaijan
Goytepe archaeological complex, Azerbaijan